Karel Nesl (26 December 1930 – 2009) was a Czech cyclist. He competed in the individual and team road race events at the 1952 Summer Olympics.

References

External links
 

1930 births
2009 deaths
Czechoslovak male cyclists
Czech male cyclists
Olympic cyclists of Czechoslovakia
Cyclists at the 1952 Summer Olympics